Riofrío de Aliste is a municipality located in the province of Zamora, Castile and León, Spain. According to the 2004 census (INE), the municipality has a population of 1,019 inhabitants.

Town hall
Riofrío de Aliste is home to the town hall of 4 towns:
Sarracín de Aliste (230 inhabitants, INE 2020).
Ríofrío de Aliste (217 inhabitants, INE 2020).
Abejera (118 inhabitants, INE 2020).
Cabañas de Aliste (70 inhabitants, INE 2020).

References

Municipalities of the Province of Zamora